Pekahou J. M. Cowan (born 2 June 1986) is an Australian rugby union footballer who plays for Japanese Top East League side Shimizu Blue Sharks. His usual position is prop and he can play on both sides of the scrum.

Early life
Cowan was born in Wellington, New Zealand but moved with his family to Sydney when he was 13 years of age. He was a young golfing talent with a handicap of four at the age of 15, and won a scholarship with the Long Reef Golf Club. Attending Narrabeen Sports High School, he was selected for the Australian Schoolboys rugby union team in 2003 and 2004.

Career
He moved to Perth to further his rugby career and played for the Nedlands club before signing with the Western Force in 2006. He played for the Perth Spirit in the Australian Rugby Championship in 2007.

Cowan made his test debut for the Wallabies against Italy in Melbourne on 20 June 2009.

Super Rugby statistics

References

External links
 Rugby Australia Profile
 Western Force Profile

1986 births
Australian rugby union players
Australian people of Cook Island descent
Australia international rugby union players
Western Force players
Rugby union props
Rugby union players from Wellington City
New Zealand emigrants to Australia
Living people
Perth Spirit players
Shimizu Koto Blue Sharks players
New South Wales Waratahs players
Wellington rugby union players